Another Side is the debut studio album by American singer Corbin Bleu. It was released by Hollywood Records on May 1, 2007. His first single off the album, "Push It to the Limit", was recorded and appears on the soundtrack of Jump In!. Bleu has stated that the album has a "pop-R&B feel". The album debuted at number thirty-six on the U.S. Billboard 200, selling about 18,000 copies in its first week. He supported his debut album by doing a solo summer tour with opening act Mitchel Musso, along with opening for Vanessa Hudgens' State & County Fair 2008 summer tour. He had covered two songs, "She Could Be" was originally sung by Christian Bautista and "Still There for Me" was originally sung by Nick Carter under the title "There for Me". As singles, "Push It to the Limit" reached #14 on the Billboard Hot 100, while "Deal with It" reached #112 on the Bubbling Under Hot 100 Singles and #87 on the Pop Songs chart.

Track listing

"Deal with It" 
The song "Deal with It" was originally written and sung by Jay Sean, who originally intended it to be the title single of his second album My Own Way (2008). He later gave it to Corbin Bleu, whose version of the song features background vocals by Jay Sean. The song earned Jay Sean a BMI Songwriter Award. Korean record label SM Entertainment purchased the rights for the song, which would later appear on boy band SHINee's Romeo EP, as "Juliette".

Charts

Release history

References 

2007 debut albums
Albums produced by Matthew Gerrard
Corbin Bleu albums
Hollywood Records albums